Northwest MedStar was a non-profit medical transport company headquartered in Spokane, Washington with bases in Spokane and the Tri-Cities, Washington area. The company serviced the states of Washington, Idaho, Oregon and Montana, transporting critical-care patients using its fleet of helicopters, fixed-wing aircraft, and ambulances.

History 

In 1994 Providence Health Care merged with Empire Health Services, creating Inland Northwest Health Services. Through this merger, the companies air ambulance services were also merged, creating Northwest MedStar. Also in 1994, the company partnered with Metro Aviation for operation services. 

In October 2009, Northwest MedStar took over management of AirLink Critical Care Transport, owned by Cascade Healthcare Community. In 2009, Eveline Bisson, a director at the company, was named Program Director of the Year by the national Association of Air Medical Services.  

In 2012, the company earned the air medical industry's Program of the Year award. Also that year, Northwest MedStar earned the Communicator of the Year Award for the work of Stephen Thompson. 

In September 2015, the company hired Matt Albright as its new director. In 2016, Life Flight Network purchased the company from Inland. 

MedStar offered a membership program allowing families to cover any emergency flights during the year for one price.

Locations
Northwest MedStar operated multiple bases in:
 Spokane
 Pullman, WA
 Moses Lake
 Richland, WA
 Brewster, WA
 Missoula, MT

Accreditations
Since 1996, Northwest MedStar had been accredited by the Commission on Accreditation of Medical Transport Systems (CAMTS).

References

External links 
Inland Northwest Health Services: Northwest Medstar
Life Flight

Ambulance services in the United States
Medical and health organizations based in Washington (state)